Henri Vidil (born 28 May 1941) is a French former swimmer. He competed in the men's 200 metre butterfly at the 1960 Summer Olympics.

References

External links
 

1941 births
Living people
Olympic swimmers of France
Swimmers at the 1960 Summer Olympics
Swimmers from Marseille
French male butterfly swimmers